Martin Bozhilov  (born ) is a Bulgarian male volleyball player. He was part of the Bulgaria men's national volleyball team at the 2014 FIVB Volleyball Men's World Championship in Poland. He played for Marek Union Ivkoni.

Clubs
 Marek Union Ivkoni (2014)

References

1988 births
Living people
Bulgarian men's volleyball players
Place of birth missing (living people)
Volleyball players at the 2015 European Games
European Games medalists in volleyball
European Games silver medalists for Bulgaria